Right or Wrong may refer to:

 Right or Wrong (Ronnie Dove album), 1964
 Right or Wrong (George Strait album), 1983
 Right or Wrong (Rosanne Cash album), 1980
 "Right or Wrong" (1921 song), a jazz ballad
 "Right or Wrong" (Wanda Jackson song), 1961
 "Right or Wrong" (Praga Khan song)